Whiteswan Lake Provincial Park is a provincial park in British Columbia, Canada, located in the Kootenay Ranges of the Rocky Mountains, 22 km east of Canal Flats.

Access 

Access is East off Highway 93/95 at the Whiteswan Lake Provincial Park exit (which is located 22 km North of Skookumchuck or 8 km South of Canal Flats).  Take the Whiteswan Forestry Road up to the park.  It is a good condition gravel logging road that is accessible during the summer season with any vehicle.  It is a 17 km drive up the road and be aware of the narrow winding section climbing up the Lussier gorge towards the end of the drive.

Features 

Two lakes, Whiteswan and Alces, and Lussier Hot Springs are the main attractions in the park.  There are a total of five lake or river side campgrounds.

References

External links 
Area map
BC Parks webpage

Provincial parks of British Columbia
Parks in the Regional District of East Kootenay